Ha Wai is part of the name of several villages in Hong Kong, including:

 Fui Sha Wai (Tai Po District)
 Fui Sha Wai (Yuen Long District)
 Luk Keng Ha Wai
 Shan Ha Wai
 Tap Mun Ha Wai
 Wo Mei Ha Wai